Francesco Lamanna (born 11 January 2002) is an Italian professional footballer who plays as a right back.

Club career
Born in Ivrea, Lamanna started his career in Juventus youth sector. For the 2019–20 season, he was loaned to Cremonese, for the Primavera team.

He left Juventus on 14 September 2020, and joined to Serie C club Novara. Lamanna made his professional debut on 27 September 2020 against Pro Vercelli.

On 3 September 2021, he signed with Gubbio. Lamanna's contract with Gubbio was terminated by mutual consent on 18 July 2022.

International career
Lamanna was a youth international for Italy U17 and Italy U18 teams.

He played the 2019 FIFA U-17 World Cup in Brazil. Lamanna disputed four matches, included the quarter-final game against Brazil.

References

External links
 
 

2002 births
Living people
People from Ivrea
Footballers from Piedmont
Italian footballers
Association football fullbacks
Serie C players
Juventus F.C. players
U.S. Cremonese players
Novara F.C. players
A.S. Gubbio 1910 players
Italy youth international footballers
Sportspeople from the Metropolitan City of Turin